In the United Kingdom, a county show is a summer outdoor agricultural show. The events have competitions, with prizes awarded by judges, allowing farmers and breeders to show off their cattle or crops. There are many trade stands which offer the latest farming machinery, feeds, fertilisers and other farming products. Other trade stands and activities have been added to make the shows more attractive to locals and visitors. Often there are features such as showjumping, funfairs, falconry, military displays and food exhibitions.

In the early years these shows used to be held in different locations each year, but in the 1960s the local agricultural societies started to buy land to create permanent showgrounds. The first purpose-built showground was in Harrogate, where the Great Yorkshire Show is held.

Many of the larger counties hold their own shows: these include the Royal County of Berkshire Show, the Cheshire Show, the Royal Cornwall Agricultural show, the Devon County Show, the Kent County Show, the Westmorland County Show, Dorset, Hampshire, Hertfordshire, Lancashire, Norfolk, Nottinghamshire, Staffordshire, Suffolk, and Surrey. Yorkshire has the Great Yorkshire Show which is claimed as the largest three-day agricultural show in England.

On the other hand, some counties have grouped together and created such shows as: The Royal Three Counties Show (Gloucestershire, Herefordshire and Worcestershire), The East of England Show (Cambridgeshire and Northamptonshire), the Royal Welsh Show, the Royal Highland Show, the South of England Show (Sussex), The Royal Bath and West Show (Somerset and Wiltshire) and the now-defunct Royal Show—the largest of all, which was held in Kenilworth, Warwickshire, but encompassed the whole country.

References

External links 
Guide to UK County Shows & Fairs

 
Annual events in the United Kingdom
Lists of fairs
Summer events in the United Kingdom
Summer festivals
Festivals in the United Kingdom